Duhaney Park Football Club is a Jamaican football club that plays in the KSAFA Super League.

History
The club was one of the first clubs in the Jamaica National Premier League when the League went semi-professional in 2000, but was relegated back to the second division (i.e. KSAFA Super League) after the 2001/2002 season. The team is based in the vibrant community of Duhaney Park in Kingston, Jamaica. The club is a registered company and enjoys strong support from the communities it represents, which includes Duhaney Park, Patrick Gardens, Washington Gardens, New Haven and Duhaney Meadows.

Achievements
KSAFA Major League: 1
1999/00

KSAFA Syd Bartlett League: 3
1987/88, 1989/90, 1993/94

Jackie Bell Knockout Competition: 1
1990/91

Rivalries
Throughout the years the club has cultivated a tenacious rivalry with cross town club Maverley/Hughenden which also plays in the KSAFA Super League. Whenever the two teams meet it is considered a derby dubbed The Kingston 20 Derby.

References

External links
 DUHANEY PARK FOOTBALL CLUB – KSAFA
 Jamaica Football Federation
 Jamaica National Premier League
 Kingston & St. Andrew Football Association (KSAFA)
 The Reggae Boyz Web Community & Blog
 List of football clubs in Jamaica
 Football in Jamaica

Football clubs in Jamaica